The 2010 New Brunswick Scotties Tournament of Hearts was held January 6–10 in Saint John, New Brunswick. The winning team represented New Brunswick at the 2010 Scotties Tournament of Hearts in Sault Ste. Marie, Ontario.

Teams

Standings

Results

Draw 1
January 6, 7:05 PM

Draw 2
January 7, 9:00 AM

Draw 3
January 7, 2:00 PM

Draw 4
January 7, 8:05 PM

Draw 5
January 8, 2:00 PM

Draw 6
January 8, 7:05 PM

Draw 7
January 9, 9:00 AM

Playoffs

Semifinal
January 9, 7:05 PM

Final
January 10, 2:00 PM

References

External links

New Brunswick
 Scotties Tournament of Hearts
New Brunswick Scotties Tournament of Hearts
Curling competitions in Saint John, New Brunswick